Lomanthus putcalensis, synonym Talamancalia putcalensis, is a species of flowering plant in the family Asteraceae. It is endemic to Ecuador. Its natural habitat is subtropical or tropical moist montane forests. The species is threatened by habitat loss.

References

Senecioneae
Endemic flora of Ecuador
Critically endangered plants
Taxonomy articles created by Polbot